Vicha Ratanachote (born February 22, 1977) is a Thai former swimmer, who specialized in middle-distance freestyle events. In 1999, Ratanachote became a SEA Games champion in the 200 m freestyle, and later represented Thailand at the 2000 Summer Olympics. While studying in the United States, he is a member of the USC Trojans swimming and diving team under head coach Mark Schubert.

At the 1999 Southeast Asian Games in Bandar Seri Begawan, Brunei, Ratanachote powered past the entire field to earn a gold medal in the 200 m freestyle with a time of 1:53.43.

Ratanachote competed in the men's 200 m freestyle at the 2000 Summer Olympics in Sydney. After winning a gold medal from the SEA Games, his entry time of 1:53.43 was accredited under a FINA B-standard. He challenged seven other swimmers in heat three, including 17-year-olds Damian Alleyne of Barbados and Wu Nien-pin of the Chinese Taipei. He rounded out the field to last place by 0.33 of a second behind Wu in a time of 1:54.91. Ratanachote failed to advance into the semifinals, as he placed thirty-first overall in the prelims.

References

1977 births
Living people
Vicha Ratanachote
Vicha Ratanachote
Swimmers at the 2000 Summer Olympics
Vicha Ratanachote
USC Trojans men's swimmers
University of Southern California alumni
Vicha Ratanachote
Swimming coaches
Asian Games medalists in swimming
Swimmers at the 1994 Asian Games
Medalists at the 1994 Asian Games
Southeast Asian Games medalists in swimming
Vicha Ratanachote
Competitors at the 1999 Southeast Asian Games
Vicha Ratanachote